Distributors Corporation of America (DCA) was an American film distribution company which distributed 60 films in the US between 1952 and 1959. DCA distributed the 1956 re-releases of The Naked City (1948) and Brute Force (1947), both produced by Mark Hellinger and directed by Jules Dassin.

DCA also distributed I Am a Camera (1955), starring Julie Harris and Laurence Harvey. Because of the original script's treatment of abortion, the film ran into censorship from the Production Code.

Hal Roach took over the company in late 1958 although DCA president Fred Schwartz remained with the company. Among the last films DCA distributed were Plan 9 from Outer Space (1957), Half Human (1958), The Strange World of Planet X (1958), and The Crawling Eye (1958).

Filmography
Alraune (1952)
Le Salaire de la peur (1953) released in the US as The Wages of Fear
Dreaming Lips (1953) German-language remake of Dreaming Lips (1937)
Questa è la vita (1954) released in the US as Of Life and Love
Pane, amore e gelosia (1954) released in the US as Frisky
Animal Farm (1954)
Rembrandt: A Self-Portrait (1954)
Rummelplatz der Liebe (1954) German version of Carnival Story with German-speaking cast
La romana (1954) released in the US as Woman of Rome
Orders Are Orders (1954)
Le rouge et le noir (1954) released in the US as The Red and the Black
The Green Man (1955)
Escapade (1955)
Pane, amore e... (1955) released in the US as Scandal in Sorrento
La Vedova X (1955) released in the US as The Widow
John and Julie (1955)
Jedda (1955) released in the US as Jedda the Uncivilized
La bella mugnaia (1955) released in the US as The Miller's Beautiful Wife
Cast a Dark Shadow (1955)
The Colditz Story (1955)
Rock, Rock, Rock (1956)
Sailor Beware! (1956) released in the US as Panic in the Parlor
Private's Progress (1956)
Hell in Korea (1956)
Die Halbstarken (1956) released in the US as Teenage Wolfpack
Des Teufels General (1956) released in the US as The Devil's General
Rodan (1956)
Il bigamo (1956) released in the US as The Bigamist
Liane, das Mädchen aus dem Urwald (1956) released in the US as Liane, Jungle Goddess
Mademoiselle Striptease (1956) released in the US as Plucking the Daisy and Please Mr. Balzac
Loser Takes All (1956)
The Silken Affair (1956)
Please Murder Me (1956)
The Captain From Köpenick (1956)
The Confessions of Felix Krull (1957)
Battle Hell (1957)
The Gold of Naples (1957)
Time Lock (1957)
The Surgeon's Knife (1957)
The Golden Age of Comedy (1957)
Monster From Green Hell (1957)
The Flesh Is Weak (1957)
Blonde in Bondage (1957)
The Crawling Eye (1958)
Plan 9 from Outer Space (1959)
Animals United (1986)

External links
Distributors Corporation of America at IMDB

References

Mass media companies established in 1952
Mass media companies disestablished in 1959
Defunct American film studios
Film distributors of the United States